Proceropycnis is a genus of fungi in the Phleogenaceae family. The genus is monotypic, containing the single species Proceropycnis pinicola, known from Spain and east Asia.

References

External links
 

Monotypic Basidiomycota genera
Atractiellales
Taxa described in 2006
Fungi of Asia
Fungi of Europe
Taxa named by Franz Oberwinkler